Florence Brunelle (born December 20, 2003) is a Canadian short-track speed skater.

Career

Junior

Brunelle competed at the third Winter Youth Olympics held in Lausanne, Switzerland. Brunelle would go onto win the bronze medal in both individual events contested: the 500 metres and 1000 metres.

Later in the season at the 2020 World Junior Short Track Speed Skating Championships in Bormio, Italy, Brunelle won two silver medals in the 500 metres and 1500 metres. At the 2022 World Junior Short Track Speed Skating Championships in Gdańsk, Poland, Brunelle improved on her silver medal performance in the 500 metres, by winning the gold and becoming World Junior Champion. Brunelle would also win the gold in the 1000 metres event and was part of the 3000 metres relay gold medal winning team.

Senior
Brunelle made her senior debut at the 2021 World Short Track Speed Skating Championships in Dordrecht, Netherlands. Brunelle made her World Cup debut in the 2021–22 season, where she won two silver medals in the women's 3000 m relay and the mixed relay.

Winter Olympics
On January 18, 2022, Brunelle was named to Canada's 2022 Olympic team. At the Winter Olympics, Brunelle advanced to the quarterfinals in her only individual event the 500 metres, while finishing fourth in the 3000 metres relay and sixth in the 2000 metres mixed relay.

References

External links

2003 births
Living people
Canadian female short track speed skaters
Sportspeople from Trois-Rivières
Short track speed skaters at the 2020 Winter Youth Olympics
Short track speed skaters at the 2022 Winter Olympics
Olympic short track speed skaters of Canada
World Short Track Speed Skating Championships medalists
Youth Olympic bronze medalists for Canada
Medalists at the 2020 Winter Youth Olympics
21st-century Canadian women